Red Riders of Canada is a 1928 American silent Western film directed by Robert De Lacey and starring Patsy Ruth Miller, Rex Lease and Harry Woods.

Cast
 Patsy Ruth Miller as Joan Duval 
 Charles Byer as RCMP Sergeant Brian Scott 
 Harry Woods as Monsieur Le Busard 
 Rex Lease as Pierre Duval 
 Barney Furey as Nicholas

References

Bibliography
 Munden, Kenneth White. The American Film Institute Catalog of Motion Pictures Produced in the United States, Part 1. University of California Press, 1997.

External links
 

1928 films
1928 Western (genre) films
Films directed by Robert De Lacey
American black-and-white films
Film Booking Offices of America films
Films set in Canada
Silent American Western (genre) films
1920s English-language films
1920s American films